The OnePlus 6 is an Android smartphone made by OnePlus. It was unveiled on 2 May 2018 and went on sale on 21-22 May 2018.

History
In March 2018, it was announced that the phone would have a "notch", but that there would be an option to hide it. On 2 April 2018, it was confirmed that the premium edition of the OnePlus 6 would feature the Snapdragon 845 processor, 8 GB of RAM and 256 GB of internal storage.

OnePlus opened forums for the OnePlus 6 in April 2018.

One week after the Oneplus 6 went on sale, OnePlus acknowledged a software bug that caused the device to drop all audio when a phone call was switched to speakerphone. This was later resolved in a 5.1.6 software update.

In November 2021, OnePlus stopped supplying software updates to the operating system.

Specifications

Hardware

 With an all-glass build different from its predecessors, the phone contains 6 or 8 GB of RAM, the Snapdragon 845 and a choice of 64, 128 or 256 GB of UFS 2.1 storage. It features a slightly larger (when compared to the OnePlus 5T) AMOLED 2280 x 1080 display with a cutout at the top for the front camera, sensors, earpiece, and notification LED. The OnePlus 6 uses 2.5D Corning Gorilla Glass 5 as a cover glass and supports Bluetooth 5.0 and NFC.
 The OnePlus 6 has two rear facing cameras. The primary one uses the Sony IMX 519 sensor with OIS while the secondary camera uses the Sony IMX 376K sensor for a bokeh effect in portrait mode.
 The phone has been specified to be dust, splash, and water resistant; however, it has not been certified with an IP Code and OnePlus suggests against submerging the device. Water damage is not covered by the warranty.
 The phone has an Alert slider on the right side with 3 notification profiles: Silent, Vibrate and Ring.
 The phone has four colour variants: Mirror Black, Midnight Black, Silk White, and Amber Red.

Software
The OnePlus 6 launched with Android 8.1 installed and uses the OxygenOS interface. The option to take part in the Android Pie beta was available from launch. The first stable version of OxygenOS 9.0 based on Android Pie was released on September 21, 2018. Currently the OnePlus 6 is on Android 11.

Network compatibility
The OnePlus 6 includes 2 variants for cellular networks worldwide.

References

External links
 

OnePlus mobile phones
Android (operating system) devices
Mobile phones introduced in 2018
Mobile phones with multiple rear cameras
Mobile phones with 4K video recording
Discontinued smartphones